Bédeilhac-et-Aynat is a commune in the Ariège department of southwestern France.

Population
Inhabitants of Bédeilhac-et-Aynat are called Bédeinatois.

See also
Communes of the Ariège department

References

Communes of Ariège (department)
Ariège communes articles needing translation from French Wikipedia
Caves of France